Reese is an anglicised spelling of the Welsh name, Rhys. It is a male given name which means "ardent" or "fiery". In the USA, the name has become a unsex name, often given to females as well as males.

In 2012, the female version of the name peaked, ranking at 128 in popularity of given names in the United States of America. The male version of the name peaked in 2003, ranked at 368; at the time, the female Reese was ranked at 464. The name Reese overall was not ranked in the top 1000 until the year 2000.

Notable people with the given name "Reese" include
 Reese Andy (born 1973), American mixed martial artist
 Reese Bowen Brabson (1817–1863), American politician
 Reese Brantmeier (born 2004), American tennis player
 Reese Clark (1847–1921), American politician
 Reese C. De Graffenreid (1859–1902), American politician
 Reese Diggs (1915–1978), American baseball player
 Reese Dismukes (born 1992), American football player
 Reese Erlich (1947–2021), American author and journalist
 Reese Fernandez-Ruiz (born 1985), Filipino entrepreneur
 Reese Griffiths (1937–2016), New Zealand rugby league footballer
 Reese Hanneman (born 1989), American skier
 Reese Havens (born 1986), American baseball player
 Reese Hoffa (born 1977), American shot putter
 Reese Johnson (born 1998), Canadian ice hockey player
 Reese Klaiber, Canadian musician
 Reese Lansangan (born 1990), Filipino musician
 Reese J. Llewellyn (1862–1936), Welsh-American businessman
 Reese Lynch (born 2001), Scottish boxer
 Reese McCall (born 1956), American football player
 Reese McGuire (born 1995), American baseball player
 Reese Milner, American bridge player
 Reese Mishler (born 1991), American actor
 Reese Palley (1922–2015), American entrepreneur
 Reese Prosser (1927–1996), American mathematician
 Reese Roper (born 1973), American singer-songwriter
 Reese Rowling (1928–2001), American businessman
 Reese Schonfeld (1931–2020), American journalist
 Reese Stalder (born 1996), American tennis player
 Reese Waters (born 1980), American comedian
 Reese Witherspoon (born 1976), American actress
 Reese Wynans (born 1947), American keyboard player

References

English masculine given names
Anglicised Welsh-language surnames